The Breiðablik women's basketball team, commonly known as Breiðablik, is the women's basketball department of the Breiðablik multi-sport club. It is based in Kópavogur, Iceland. As of 2018–2019 season its plays in the Icelandic top-tier Úrvalsdeild kvenna.

History
During their first season in the Úrvaldeild in 1994–95, Breiðablik won the national championship after beating Keflavík in the finals.

In 2017 the club won promotion from 1. deild kvenna to the Úrvalsdeild.

In 2019, Breiðablik finished last in the league but was speared from relegation as Stjarnan withdrew its team from the Úrvalsdeild.

Honours

Titles
Úrvalsdeild kvenna
 Winners: 1995
Icelandic Supercup
 Winners: 1995
1. deild kvenna
 Winners (3): 1994, 2005, 2014

Individual awards

Úrvalsdeild Women's Playoffs MVP 
Penny Peppas - 1995
Úrvalsdeild Women's Foreign Player of the Year 
Betsy Harris - 1996
Úrvalsdeild Women's Domestic All-First Team 
Isabella Ósk Sigurðardóttir - 2021, 2022
1. deild kvenna Domestic MVP
Sóllilja Bjarnadóttir - 2017
1. deild kvenna All-First team
Sóllilja Bjarnadóttir - 2017
Telma Lind Ásgeirsdóttir - 2017
Isabella Ósk Sigurðardóttir - 2017

1. deild kvenna Young Player of the Year
Isabella Ósk Sigurðardóttir - 2016
1. deild kvenna Coach of the Year
Hildur Sigurðardóttir - 2017

Notable players

Coaches
 Sigurður Hjörleifsson 1994–1996
 Birgir Mikaelsson 1996–1997
 Hildur Sigurðardóttir 2016–2018
 Margrét Sturlaugsdóttir 2018
 Antonio D’Albero 2018–2019
 Ívar Ásgrímsson 2019–2022
 Yngvi Gunnlaugsson 2022–present

References

External links
Breiðablik team info

Breiðablik (basketball)